The Tianjin Radio and Television Tower is a -tall tower in Tianjin, China used primarily for communication. It is the 8th tallest freestanding tower in the world. It was built in 1991 at a cost of $45 million. It is a member of the World Federation of Great Towers.

See also
 List of towers
 List of tallest freestanding structures in the world
 Fernsehturm Stuttgart – first TV tower built from concrete and prototype

Notes

External links
 World Federation of Great Towers
 Tianjin Radio and Television Tower at Skyscraperpage.com
 

Towers completed in 1991
Observation towers in China
Communication towers in China
Buildings and structures in Tianjin
Tourist attractions in Tianjin
Towers with revolving restaurants
1991 establishments in China